Emil Seidel (December 13, 1864 – June 24, 1947) was a prominent German-American politician. Seidel was the mayor of Milwaukee from 1910 to 1912. The first Socialist mayor of a major city in the United States, Seidel became the Vice Presidential candidate for the Socialist Party of America in the 1912 presidential election.

Biography

Early years

Seidel was born December 13, 1864 in the town of Ashland in Schuylkill County, Pennsylvania, the son of ethnic German emigrants from Pomerania.  His family moved to Wisconsin in 1867, living first in Prairie du Chien before moving to the state capital of Madison. Seidel's father, Otto Seidel, was a carpenter, and his mother, Henrietta Knoll Seidel, was a homemaker.

Seidel attended public school up to the age of 13, when he dropped out to become a woodcarver. He continued to study after leaving school, reading extensively. At the age of 19 he started a trade union of local woodworkers, becoming the organization's first secretary.

At the age of 22, Seidel went abroad to refine his skills as a woodcarver. He lived for six years in Berlin, working at his trade during the day and attending school at night. It was in this period that Seidel first became an active socialist.

In 1895, Seidel married the former Lucy Geissel. They had one son, Lucius, who died in infancy, and one daughter, Viola. The pair would ultimately divorce in 1924.

Political career

When Seidel returned to the United States in 1892 he joined the Socialist Labor Party of America. Seidel was a charter member of the first SLP branch in Milwaukee. He also became an active member of the Pattern Makers Union.

Seidel later joined the Social Democracy of America (established 1897), the Social Democratic Party of America (established 1898), and the Socialist Party of America (established 1901) in turn. He resided briefly in Washington state, serving as the first secretary of Local Redmond SPA in the fall of 1901.

In 1904 Seidel was one of nine Socialists to win electoral victory as Milwaukee city aldermen, elected in the city's 20th ward. He served two terms in that position before making his first mayoral run in 1908. He was returned as a city alderman at large in the election of 1909.

In 1910, Seidel was elected mayor of Milwaukee, becoming the first Socialist mayor of a major city in the United States. During his administration the first public works department was established, the first fire and police commission was organized, and a city park system came into being. Seidel cleaned up the town with strict regulation of bars and the closing of brothels and sporting parlors (modern-day casinos).  During his administration Seidel employed the noted American poet and author Carl Sandburg as his personal secretary. Seidel's socialist inclinations had attracted Sandburg to Milwaukee.

In his Spring 1912 bid for re-election, Seidel faced the combined forces of the Democratic and Republican parties, who ran a single candidate in order to defeat Seidel and the Socialists. Despite winning more votes in 1912 than in 1910, Seidel was defeated by Gerhard Bading, local doctor, professor of surgery, and commissioner of health, on a fusion Democratic-Republican ticket.

Freed of his mayoral duties by electoral defeat, Seidel became a logical choice as the Socialist Party's nominee for Vice President of the United States on the ticket with Eugene V. Debs. The pair won 901,551 votes in the 1912 presidential election, 6% of the total vote.

Seidel tried to win re-election as mayor of Milwaukee in 1914, but was soundly defeated. He was returned to the city council as an alderman at large in the city election of 1916. He won re-election in 1918, remaining at the post until 1920.

Seidel, an opponent of World War I, voted against Milwaukee's purchase of Liberty bonds to help finance the war effort. He also was an outspoken opponent of a proposed Milwaukee "loyalty ordinance". In the superheated wartime political climate, marked by political repression of the anti-war movement, Seidel ran afoul of the law when he was arrested on November 12, 1917, in Horicon, Wisconsin following a speech he made there. Charged with "tending to provoke an assault or breach of peace during an address", he was fined $50.

In 1932, Seidel ran for a seat in the United States Senate from Wisconsin, winning 6% of the vote. He served a final four-year stint as a Milwaukee city alderman from 1932 until 1936.

Later years

Seidel retired from political life in the middle 1930s. He remained a resident of Milwaukee, living on the northwest side of the city, passing his time painting, composing music, creating poetry, and writing his autobiography.

Death and legacy

Seidel died in Milwaukee on  June 24, 1947, following an illness of several months' duration related to complications from a heart condition. He was 82 years old.

Seidel's unpublished memoirs reside in Madison at the Wisconsin Historical Society, where they are available to scholars on microfilm.

See also
 List of elected socialist mayors in the United States
 Daniel Hoan
 Frank P. Zeidler
 Social-Democratic Party of Wisconsin

References

Works 

What We Have Done in Milwaukee. Chicago, IL: National Office of the Socialist Party, 1911.
Which Must Go? America or Private Ownership of Railroads? Milwaukee: Socialist Party of Wisconsin, 1923.
 Thy Kingdom Come: Sketches from My Life: Autobiography of Emil Seidel. [1944] Madison, WI: State Historical Society of Wisconsin.
 Joining the Socialist Movement. Corvallis, OR: 1000 Flowers Publishing, 2013.
 Building the Social Democratic Party. Corvallis, OR: 1000 Flowers Publishing, 2013.

Further reading

External links

|-

1864 births
1947 deaths
American trade unionists of German descent
American woodcarvers
Mayors of Milwaukee
Milwaukee Common Council members
Patternmakers (industrial)
People from Ashland, Pennsylvania
Socialist Party of America politicians from Wisconsin
1912 United States vice-presidential candidates
Writers from Pennsylvania
Writers from Wisconsin